The sooty-fronted spinetail (Synallaxis frontalis) is a species of bird in the family Furnariidae. It is found in Argentina, Bolivia, Brazil, Paraguay, and Uruguay. Its natural habitats are subtropical or tropical dry forests, subtropical or tropical moist lowland forests, and heavily degraded former forest.

References

sooty-fronted spinetail
Birds of Argentina
Birds of Bolivia
Birds of Brazil
Birds of Paraguay
Birds of Uruguay
sooty-fronted spinetail
Taxonomy articles created by Polbot